Ciply is a village of Wallonia and a district of the municipality of Mons, located in the province of Hainaut, Belgium.

Gallery 

Sub-municipalities of Mons
Former municipalities of Hainaut (province)